2022 Sibi explosion may refer to:
 2022 Sibi suicide bombing
 2022 Sibi IED explosion